is a Japanese actress, voice actress and singer from Tokyo, Japan. She is best known for her role as Arle Nadja in Puyo Puyo Fever and Puyo Puyo Tetris. She is also the official Japanese dubbing roles for Hayley Atwell, Elisha Cuthbert, Kirsten Dunst and many more.

Filmography

Television animation
1997
 Dragoon (Bubb)
1998
 Legend of Basara (Shinbashi)
1999
 Elf ban Kakyuusei (Miyuki Iijima)
 To Heart (female student; school announcement; Yoshii)
2000
 Doki Doki Densetsu Mahōjin Guru Guru (Star Soldier; little girl)
 Yu-Gi-Oh! Duel Monsters (Kenta)
2001
 The Legend of Condor Hero (Shouryuujo)
 Comic Party (Aya Hasebe; Mayu Yumeji)
 Steel Angel Kurumi 2 (Uruka Sumeragi)
2002
 Beyblade V-Force (Queen)
 Cyborg 009 (Lina)
 Gun Frontier (Maya Yukikaze; Tarou)
 Happy Lesson (Hazuki Yazakura; Female Student)
 Whistle! (Akira Saionji)
2003
 Kino's Journey (Female Examiner)
2004
 Bleach (Sode no Shirayuki)
 Burst Angel (Nadeshiko)
 Diamond Daydreams (Jun)
 Gantz (Sei Sakuraoka; High School Girl; Young Kurono)
2005
 MÄR (Chimera)
 Sugar Sugar Rune (Prattle)
2006
 Bakumatsu Kikansetsu Irohanihoheto (Kotoha)
 Glass Fleet (Mischka)
 Humanoid Monster Bem (Urara Hinata)
 The Story of Saiunkoku (Kou Shoukun)
 xxxHolic (Voice)
 Yoshinaga-san Chi no Gargoyle (Kayanai)
 Witchblade (Reina "Lady" Soho)
2007
 Naruto Shippuden (Yugito Nii, Kokuō)
 Ghost Hunt (Youko Yoshimi)
 Romeo × Juliet (Lancelot's Wife)
2008
 Naruto Shippuden (Yugito Nii, Kokuo)
 Strike Witches (Gertrud Barkhorn)
2009
 Isekai no Seikishi Monogatari (Yukine Mare)
2011
 Beyblade: Metal Fury (Ryuto)
2012
 Kingdom (Yo Tan Wa)
2013
 Vividred Operation (Crow)
 Yu-Gi-Oh! Zexal II (Umimi Habara)
2014
 Your Lie in April (Hiroko Seto)
 One Piece (Violet)
 Yu-Gi-Oh! Arc-V (Sora Shiun'in)
2016
 Kiznaiver (Mutsumi "Urushy" Urushibara)
2017
 Princess Principal (Zelda)
2018
 My Hero Academia (Nana Shimura)
 Legend of the Galactic Heroes: Die Neue These (Dominique Saint-Pierré)
2019
 Fairy Gone (Nein Auraa)
 Fruits Basket (Tohru's Aunt)
 Strike Witches 501st Unit, Taking Off! (Gertrud Barkhorn)
 Star Twinkle PreCure (Darknest/Ophiuchus)
2020
 Great Pretender (Cynthia Moore)
 Digimon Adventure: (Yuuko Kamiya/Gatomon/Skullknightmon/Axeknightmon)
2021
 World Trigger 2nd Season (Wen Sō)
 SK8 the Infinity (Nanako Hasegawa)
 Edens Zero (Madame Kurenai)
2022
 The Greatest Demon Lord Is Reborn as a Typical Nobody (Olivia vel Vine)
 Aoashi (Noriko Aoi)
2023
 High Card (Brandy Blumenthal)
 The Legend of Heroes: Trails of Cold Steel – Northern War (Jeina Storm)

Original video animation
 YU-NO (1998) (Eriko Takeda)
 Refrain Blue (2000) (Mystic Girl)
 Tenbatsu! Angel Rabbie (2004) (Arte Sema)
 Naruto Special: Battle at Hidden Falls (2004) (Himatsu)
 Growlanser IV (2005) (Dianna Silvernale)
 Stratos 4 Advance (2006) (Nakamura Saiun)

Original net animation
 Pokémon Evolutions (2021) (Lusamine)
 Junji Ito Maniac: Japanese Tales of the Macabre (2023) (Mitsu Uchida)

Theatrical animation
 Strike Witches: The Movie (2012) (Gertrud Barkhorn)
 Bayonetta: Bloody Fate (2013) (Jeanne)
 Cyborg 009 VS Devilman (2015) (Daemon Lilith)
 To Every You I've Loved Before (2022)
 To Me, The One Who Loved You (2022)

Video games
 Twins Story: Kimi ni Tsutaetakute (1998) (Shinnosuke Nakamura)
 Shadow Hearts (2001) (Margarete Gertrude Zelle)
 Growlanser IV (2003) (Dianna Silvernale)
 Puyo Puyo series (2003–2020) (Arle Nadja, Klug, Strange Klug, Dark Arle, Doppelganger Arle, Shizunagi)
 Sakura Taisen V (2005) (Subaru Kujo)
 Tales of Legendia (2005) (Stella Telmes)
 Final Fantasy XII (2006) (Ashe B'nargin Dalmasca)
 Eternal Sonata (2007) (Claves)
 Luminous Arc (2007) (Saki)
 Street Fighter IV (2008) (Crimson Viper)
 BioShock (2008) (Brigid Tenenbaum)
 Bayonetta (2009, Wii U version) (Jeanne)
 Final Fantasy XIII (2009) (Jihl Nabaat)
 Fragile Dreams: Farewell Ruins of the Moon (2009) (Crow)
 Super Street Fighter IV (2010) (Crimson Viper)
 Marvel vs. Capcom 3: Fate of Two Worlds (2011) (Crimson Viper)
 Ace Combat: Assault Horizon (2011, Japanese version) (Janice Rehl)
 Sly Cooper Collection (2011) (Carmelita Montoya Fox)
 Ultimate Marvel vs. Capcom 3 (2011) (Crimson Viper)
 Final Fantasy XIII-2 (2011) (Jihl Nabaat)
 Deus Ex: Human Revolution (2011) (Megan Reed)
 Yakuza 5 (2012) (Mariko)
 Bayonetta 2 (2014) (Jeanne)
 Hyrule Warriors (2014) (Narration)
 Far Cry 4 (2015) (Amita)
 Street Fighter V (2016) (Crimson Viper)
 Yakuza 6 (2016) (Mariko)
 Granblue Fantasy (2017) (Ilsa)
 Overwatch (2017) (Moira)
 Pokémon Masters (2019) (Cynthia)
 Arknights (2019) (FEater)
 Another Eden (2019) (Bivette)
 Nioh 2 (2020) (Oichi)
 The Good Life (2021) (Naomi Hayward, Elizabeth Dickens, Pauline Atwood)
 Bayonetta 3 (2022) (Jeanne)
 Tactics Ogre: Reborn (2022) (Ozma Moh Glacius)
 Octopath Traveler II (2023) (Rai Mei)

Dubbing roles

Live-action
Hayley Atwell
Captain America: The First Avenger (Peggy Carter)
The Avengers (Peggy Carter)
Captain America: The Winter Soldier (Peggy Carter)
Avengers: Age of Ultron (Peggy Carter)
Ant-Man (Peggy Carter)
Agent Carter (Peggy Carter)
Cinderella (Cinderella's Mother)
Christopher Robin (Evelyn Robin)
Avengers: Endgame (Peggy Carter)
Elisha Cuthbert
Popular Mechanics for Kids (Elisha Cuthbert)
Lucky Girl (Kaitlyn Palmerston)
24 (Kimberly Bauer)
Lucky Girl (Kaitlyn Palmerston)
The Girl Next Door (Danielle)
House of Wax (Carly Jones)
The Quiet (Nina Deer)
Captivity (Jennifer Tree)
Kirsten Dunst
The Hairy Bird (Verena von Stefan)
Elizabethtown (Claire Colburn)
Marie Antoinette (Queen Marie Antoinette of France)
Bachelorette (Regan Crawford)
The Two Faces of January (Colette MacFarland)
Hidden Figures (Vivian Mitchell)
The Beguiled (Edwina Morrow)
The Power of the Dog (Rose Gordon)
Jordana Brewster
Fast & Furious (Mia Toretto-O'Conner)
Fast Five (Mia Toretto-O'Conner)
Fast & Furious 6 (Mia Toretto-O'Conner)
Furious 7 (Mia Toretto-O'Conner)
Home Sweet Hell (Dusty)
F9 (Mia Toretto)
Kelly Reilly
L'Auberge Espagnole (Wendy)
Mrs Henderson Presents (Maureen)
Sherlock Holmes (Mary Morstan)
Sherlock Holmes: A Game of Shadows (Mary Watson)
Heaven Is for Real (Sonja Burpo)
Anne Hathaway
Ella Enchanted (Netflix edition) (Ella of Frell)
Becoming Jane (Jane Austen)
The Dark Knight Rises (Selina Kyle/Catwoman)
Interstellar (Amelia Brand)
The Intern (Jules Ostin)
Rose Byrne
Adam (Beth Buchwald)
Bridesmaids (Helen Harris III)
Insidious (Renai Lambert)
Insidious: Chapter 2 (Renai Lambert)
13 Minutes (Else Härlen (Katharina Schüttler))
500 Days of Summer (Autumn (Minka Kelly))
Across the Universe (Lucy (Evan Rachel Wood))
Adventureland (Em Lewin (Emily) (Kristen Stewart))
The Aftermath (Rachael Morgan (Keira Knightley))
Against the Dark (Dorothy (Jenna Harrison))
American Dreamz (Sally Kendoo (Mandy Moore))
Apple of My Eye (Caroline Andrews (Amy Smart))
Armour of God (May Bannon (Lola Forner))
Black Swan (Elizabeth "Beth" MacIntyre / The Dying Swan (Winona Ryder))
Breach (Juliana O'Neill (Caroline Dhavernas))
Brightburn (Tori Breyer (Elizabeth Banks))
Burnt (Helene (Sienna Miller))
The Chaser (Detective Oh Eun-shil (Park Hyo-joo))
The Chorus (Count's Wife (Carole Weiss))
Coherence (Emily (Emily Baldoni))
Criminal Minds (Jennifer 'JJ' Jareau (A. J. Cook))
CSI: NY (Lindsay Monroe-Messer (Anna Belknap))
CZ12 (Coco (Yao Xingtong))
The Deaths of Ian Stone (Jenny Walker (Christina Cole))
Don't Worry Darling (Bunny (Olivia Wilde))
Epic Movie (Lucy Pervertski (Jayma Mays))
Flying Swords of Dragon Gate (Ling Yanqiu (Zhou Xun))
G.I. Joe: The Rise of Cobra (Anastasia DeCobray / Baroness (Sienna Miller))
Game of Thrones (Talisa Maegyr (Oona Chaplin))
The Girl on the Train (Rachel Watson (Emily Blunt))
Glass (Dr. Ellie Staple (Sarah Paulson))
Glass Onion: A Knives Out Mystery (Birdie Jay (Kate Hudson))
Godmothered (Mackenzie (Isla Fisher))
A Good Day to Die Hard (Lucy McClane (Mary Elizabeth Winstead))
The Good Lie (Carrie Davis (Reese Witherspoon))
The Great Magician (Liu Yin (Zhou Xun))
Grey's Anatomy (Lexie Grey (Chyler Leigh))
The Handmaid's Tale (Serena Joy Waterford (Yvonne Strahovski))
He's Just Not That Into You (Gigi Phillips (Ginnifer Goodwin))
Her (Amy (Amy Adams))
Honey (Honey Daniels (Jessica Alba))
How Do You Know (Lisa Jorgenson (Reese Witherspoon))
I Feel Pretty (Avery LeClaire (Michelle Williams))
Into the Blue (Amanda Collins (Ashley Scott))
J. Edgar (Helen Gandy (Naomi Watts))
The Jacket (Jackie Price (Keira Knightley))
John Tucker Must Die (Kate Spencer (Brittany Snow))
Joy Ride 2: Dead Ahead (Melissa Scott (Nicki Aycox))
The King's Man (Polly (Gemma Arterton))
Let the Right One In (Oskar Eriksson (Kåre Hedebrant))
Live Free or Die Hard (Lucy McClane (Mary Elizabeth Winstead))
Manchester by the Sea (Randi (Michelle Williams))
The Muppets (Veronica (Rashida Jones))
The Namesake (Maxine Ratcliffe (Jacinda Barrett))
No Time to Die (Madeleine Swann (Léa Seydoux))
Ocean's 8 (Tammy (Sarah Paulson))
Once (Girl (Markéta Irglová))
One Missed Call (Taylor Anthony (Ana Claudia Talancón))
One Tree Hill (Peyton Sawyer (Hilarie Burton))
Orange is the New Black (Piper Chapman (Taylor Schilling))
Oz the Great and Powerful (Glinda (Michelle Williams))
Painted Skin: The Resurrection (Xiao Wei (Zhou Xun))
Priest (Priestess (Maggie Q))
Push (Cassie Holmes (Dakota Fanning))
A Quiet Place (Evelyn Abbott (Emily Blunt))
A Quiet Place Part II (Evelyn Abbott (Emily Blunt))
Race (Leni Riefenstahl (Carice van Houten))
Rémi sans famille (Mrs. Barberin (Ludivine Sagnier))
Salmon Fishing in the Yemen (Harriet Chetwode-Talbot (Emily Blunt))
Scooby-Doo (Daphne Blake (Sarah Michelle Gellar))
Scooby-Doo 2: Monsters Unleashed (Daphne Blake (Sarah Michelle Gellar))
The Secret Life of Bees (Lily Owens (Dakota Fanning))
Shooter (Julie Swagger (Shantel VanSanten))
Skyline (Elaine (Scottie Thompson))
Skylines (Rose Corley (Lindsey Morgan))
Smallville (Lois Lane (Erica Durance))
Southland Tales (Madeline Frost Santaros (Mandy Moore))
Spectre (Dr. Madeleine Swann (Léa Seydoux))
Stardust (Victoria Forester (Sienna Miller))
Step Up: All In (Andie West (Briana Evigan))
Stranger Things (Joyce Byers (Winona Ryder))
This Is Us (Rebecca Pearson (Mandy Moore))
The Time Traveler's Wife (Clare Abshire-DeTamble (Rachel McAdams))
The Tomorrow War (Colonel Muri Forester (Yvonne Strahovski))
Valentine's Day (Julia Fitzpatrick (Jennifer Garner))
The Village (Ivy Walker (Bryce Dallas Howard))
Walk the Line (Vivian Liberto (Ginnifer Goodwin))
War (Kira Yanagawa (Devon Aoki))
Water for Elephants (Marlena Rosenbluth (Reese Witherspoon))
Wheels on Meals (Sylvia (Lola Forner))
Yesterday (Ellie Appleton (Lily James))
Young Goethe in Love (Lotte Buff (Miriam Stein))
Younger (Liza Miller (Sutton Foster))

Animation
 American Dragon: Jake Long (Trixie Carter)
 The Angry Birds Movie (Matilda)
 The Angry Birds Movie 2 (Matilda)
 Cars 3 (Natalie Certain)
 The Croods: A New Age (Hope Betterman)
 Happy Feet (Gloria)
 KaBlam! (Thundergirl)
 Open Season (Giselle)
 Open Season 2 (Giselle)
 Open Season 3 (Giselle)
 Sausage Party (Brenda Bunson)
 Tangled: The Series (Cassandra)
 Tinker Bell (Iridessa)
 Tinker Bell and the Lost Treasure (Iridessa)
 Tinker Bell and the Great Fairy Rescue (Iridessa)
 Tinker Bell and the Secret of the Wings (Iridessa)
 Tinker Bell and the Pirate Fairy (Iridessa)
 Tinker Bell and the Legend of the NeverBeast (Iridessa)
 WALL-E (Eve)
 What If...? (Peggy Carter)

References

External links
  
 Official agency profile 
 Mie Sonozaki at GamePlaza-Haruka Voice Acting Database 
 Mie Sonozaki at Hitoshi Doi's Seiyuu Database
 

1973 births
Living people
Anime singers
Japanese women pop singers
Japanese musical theatre actresses
Japanese video game actresses
Japanese voice actresses
Singers from Tokyo
Voice actresses from Tokyo
20th-century Japanese actresses
21st-century Japanese actresses
20th-century Japanese women singers
20th-century Japanese singers
21st-century Japanese women singers
21st-century Japanese singers